The 2022 NextEra Energy 250 was the first stock car race of the 2022 NASCAR Camping World Truck Series season and was the 23rd iteration of the event. The race was held on Friday, February 18, 2022, in Daytona Beach, Florida, at Daytona International Speedway, a 2.5 mile (4 km) permanent asphalt superspeedway. The race was extended from 100 laps to 106 laps due to a NASCAR overtime finish. At race's end, the race was won by Zane Smith under caution after a wreck had occurred on the final lap. The win was Smith's fourth career NASCAR Camping World Truck Series win and his first win of the season. To fill out the podium, Ben Rhodes and Christian Eckes of ThorSport Racing would finish second and third, respectively.

Background 
Daytona International Speedway is one of three superspeedways to hold NASCAR races, the other two being Indianapolis Motor Speedway and Talladega Superspeedway. The standard track at Daytona International Speedway is a four-turn superspeedway that is 2.5 miles (4.0 km) long. The track's turns are banked at 31 degrees, while the front stretch, the location of the finish line, is banked at 18 degrees.

Entry list 

*Withdrew due to wrecking in the practice session.

Practice 
The only 50-minute practice session was held on Thursday, February 17, at 4:35 PM EST.

Qualifying 
Qualifying was held on Friday, February 18, at 3:00 PM EST. Since Daytona International Speedway is a superspeedway, the qualifying system used is a single-car, single-lap system with two rounds. In the first round, drivers have one lap to set a time. The fastest ten drivers from the first round move on to the second round. Whoever sets the fastest time in Round 2 wins the pole.

Five drivers would fail to qualify: Jordan Anderson, Jennifer Jo Cobb, Matt Jaskol, Chase Purdy, and Clay Greenfield.

Full qualifying results

Race results 
Stage 1 Laps: 20

Stage 2 Laps: 20

Stage 3 Laps: 66

Standings after the race

Drivers' Championship standings

Note: Only the first 10 positions are included for the driver standings.

References 

NASCAR races at Daytona International Speedway
NextEra Energy 250
NextEra Energy 250
2022 NASCAR Camping World Truck Series